George W. Bailey Jr. (April 6, 1833 – July 17, 1865) was a Vermont attorney and public official.  He served for four years as Secretary of State of Vermont.

Biography
George Washington Bailey Jr. was born in Elmore, Vermont on April 6, 1833; he was the son of George W. Bailey Sr. (1768-1868) and Rebecca Warren Bailey (1802-1885), and named for an older brother who was born in 1826 and died in 1831.  The senior Bailey was a veteran of the War of 1812, and the longtime president of the Vermont Mutual Insurance Company.  He also served as probate judge for Washington County and in other offices.

George Bailey Jr. studied law, and was admitted to the bar in 1858.  He resided in Middlesex and practiced in Montpelier.

A Republican, Bailey served as Deputy Secretary of State while Benjamin W. Dean was Secretary of State.  Dean died in July, 1861; Bailey served as acting secretary pending an election in October.  In October, Bailey was elected to a full term.  He won annual reelection three times, and served until his death.

Death and burial
Bailey died of tuberculosis in Middlesex on July 17, 1865.  He was buried at Green Mount Cemetery in Montpelier.

Family
In 1862, Bailey married Georgiana Reed of Montpelier.  After his death, she married E. Henry Powell, Vermont's longtime State Auditor.

References

Sources

Internet

Books

Newspapers

1833 births
1865 deaths
People from Elmore, Vermont
People from Middlesex, Vermont
Vermont lawyers
Vermont Republicans
Secretaries of State of Vermont
19th-century American lawyers
Burials at Green Mount Cemetery (Montpelier, Vermont)